Capra Black is the debut album by American jazz saxophonist Billy Harper. It was recorded in 1973 and released on the Strata-East label.

Reception 
In his review for AllMusic, Jason Ankeny praised the album, stating "Capra Black remains one of the seminal recordings of jazz's black consciousness movement. A profoundly spiritual effort that channels both the intellectual complexity of the avant-garde as well as the emotional potency of gospel, its focus and assurance belie Billy Harper's inexperience as a leader".

Track listing 
All compositions by Billy Harper
"Capra Black" - 11:17
"Sir Galahad" - 8:00
"New Breed" - 4:30
"Soulfully, I Love You / Black Spiritual of Love" - 10:34
"Cry of Hunger" - 10:46

Personnel 
Billy Harper - tenor saxophone, voice
Jimmy Owens - trumpet
Dick Griffin, Julian Priester - trombone
George Cables - piano
Reggie Workman - bass
Billy Cobham, Elvin Jones, Warren Smith - drums
Barbara Grant, Gene McDaniels, Laveda Johnson, Pat Robinson - voice

References 

1973 albums
Billy Harper albums
Strata-East Records albums